Fatimat Olufunke Raji-Rasaki (born 1 January 1957) is a Nigerian politician, senator and former first lady of Ogun, Ondo and Lagos states between 1986 and 1991.

Early life and education
Raji-Rasaki was born in Ekiti State on 1 January 1957. She went to the Doherty Memorial Grammar School in Ijero, before studying law at the University of Lagos.

She was elected as the senator for Ekiti central in Ekiti state. There were over 100 senators elected in the 8th assembly in 2015, but only six of these were women. The others were Stella Oduah and Uche Ekwunife who both represent Anambra, Rose Okoji Oko, Oluremi Tinubu and Binta Garba.

Career 
She was chairman of the senate committee on Trade and Investment in the 8th assembly that had Bukola Saraki as President of the senate.

Personal life 
In 2016 she celebrated 40 years of marriage to Brigadier General Raji Alagbe Rasaki.

References

1957 births
Living people
People from Ekiti State
Nigerian civil servants
Peoples Democratic Party members of the Senate (Nigeria)
Women members of the Senate (Nigeria)
21st-century Nigerian politicians
21st-century Nigerian women politicians
University of Lagos alumni